Mari Hagen (born 8 April 1981) is a Norwegian politician for the Socialist Left Party.

She served as a deputy representative to the Norwegian Parliament from Buskerud during the term 2001–2005. In total she met during 16 days of parliamentary session.

References

1981 births
Living people
Socialist Left Party (Norway) politicians
Deputy members of the Storting
Buskerud politicians
Place of birth missing (living people)
21st-century Norwegian women politicians
21st-century Norwegian politicians
Women members of the Storting